The Brubeck Institute was a special program at the University of the Pacific's Conservatory of Music. It was founded in 2000 by noted Jazz pianist and Pacific alum Dave Brubeck. The Brubeck Institute consists of several different programs and initiatives that aim to support and promote jazz education and performance.

External links
https://web.archive.org/web/20060901201406/http://www.pacific.edu/brubeck/
http://www.pacific.edu/conservatory
http://www.pacific.edu

University of the Pacific (United States)
Music education organizations
Educational institutions established in 2001
2001 establishments in California